I Vant to Bite Your Finger is a board game designed by Charles Phillips and Charlie Leicht published by Ideal Toys in collaboration with Hasbro in 1979, in which waking a vampire represented as a roughly foot tall  standee on the game board obligated the player to place his or her finger in the vampire's mouth, where it would be bitten by "fangs" that were actually small, red felt-tip markers.

Details
I Vant to Bite Your Finger is suggested to be played with 2–4 players ages 6 and up. On their turn, a player calls out a number and turns a pointer on a clock dial located on the vampire figure by that many positions which may cause the vampire's cape to fly open. If the cloak remains closed the player advances their token that many spaces along the board track towards the end. If the cloak opens that player must insert their finger into the vampire's mouth while another player attempts to depress a plunger behind the vampire's head. If the plunger depresses the player's finger is marked with two red dots from a twin nibbed felt-tip marker located in the mouth and must return their token to the start space, otherwise the player's token remains where it is. The clock dial mechanism is designed to open the cape, ostensibly unpredictably, once per revolution.

The gameboard mostly comprises 14 red circular spaces, a start space and an end space, representing a dirt track around a dark hill side castle and graveyard. The player tokens are white discs with silhouette cut outs to represent one each of a spider, a rat, a snake, and a bat. Only one token could occupy each red space, with subsequent players required to call a number such that they would complete a successful move on a free red space or the end space.

References

External links
 I Vant to Bite Your Finger at BoardGameGeek
 Original commercial on YouTube

Board games introduced in 1979
Horror board games